The Water Witch Club Historic District is located in Middletown Township, Monmouth County, New Jersey. The district was added to the National Register of Historic Places on March 12, 2004.

References

External links

Historic districts on the National Register of Historic Places in New Jersey
Houses on the National Register of Historic Places in New Jersey
Shingle Style architecture in New Jersey
Geography of Monmouth County, New Jersey
Middletown Township, New Jersey
National Register of Historic Places in Monmouth County, New Jersey
Houses in Monmouth County, New Jersey
New Jersey Register of Historic Places